Aşktır Beni Güzel Yapan (This is Love that Makes Me Beautiful) is the name of a Turkish album by Asya. It is her fifth studio album, released in Turkey in 2007.

Track listing
 "Kırmızı Kart" (Red Card)
 "Tesadüfen" (by Chance)
 "Gittin Gideli" (Since You have Gone) 
 "Git Güle Güle" (Bye Bye) 
 "Aşktır Beni Güzel Yapan" (This is Love That Makes Me Beautiful)
 "Canım" (Honey)
 "Senden Sonra" (After You)
 "Teslim Oldum Aşka" (I Surrender Myself to The Love)
 "Yaprak Döken Benim" (This is Me Who Patch off)
 "Yeter" (Enough)

Music & Lyrics
Asya, Gürsel Çelik.

Asya (singer) albums
2007 albums